Barrabas is a 1920 French silent crime thriller film serial directed and written by Louis Feuillade.

Plot
Rudolph Strelitz, known as 'Barrabas', is the brutal leader of an underground gang who causes mayhem and destruction to the lives of civilized people.  A lawyer, Claude Varèse, is strongly determined to bring Strelitz to justice for the purpose of revenge, after his father was wrongly guillotined for the murder of Laure d'Hérigny, a mistress of a missing American millionaire. Later Claude Varèse's sister, Françoise, is then abducted by the evil Dr Lucius, one of Barrabas' henchmen.

Cast
Fernand Herrmann ...  L'avocat Jacques Varèse
Édouard Mathé ...  Raoul de Nérac
Gaston Michel ...  Rudolph Strélitz
Georges Biscot ...  Biscotin
Blanche Montel ...  Françoise Varèse
Jeanne Rollette ...  Biscotine
Albert Mayer ...  Rougier
Edmond Bréon ...  Dr. Lucius 
Lugane ...  Simne Delpierre
Lyne Stanka ...  Laure d'Herigny
Violette Jyl ... Noëlle Maupré
Laurent Morléas ...  Laugier
Olinda Mano ...  La petite Odette

Episodes

External links 

1920 films
French silent feature films
French black-and-white films
French gangster films
French crime thriller films
Films directed by Louis Feuillade
1920s crime thriller films
Silent thriller films
1920s French films
Film serials